The following is a list of episodes from the series Vampirina.

Series overview

Episodes

Season 1 (2017–18)
Vampirina was present in all episodes in this season.
Demi was absent from 2 episodes: "Woodchuck Woodsies" and "Game Night" (mentioned only).
Poppy was absent from 6 episodes: "Super Natural", "The Little Witch", "Critters!", "Batty Fever" (mentioned), "Dust Bunnies" and "Acrobat Boris".
Bridget was absent from 17 episodes "Scare B&B", "Vee Goes Viral", "The Plant Predicament", "Super Natural", "Vamping Trip", "The Little Witch", "Vampire Weekend", "The Bird Who Knew Too Much", "Oldie But a Ghouldie", "Critters!", "Batty Fever", "Dust Bunnies", "Mummy's Day", "Acrobat Boris", "Uncle Bigfoot", "Nanpire and Grandpop the Greats" and "There's Snow Place Like Home".
Edgar was absent from 24 episodes: "The Plant Predicament", "Little Terror", "Super Natural" (mentioned), "Bone Appetit", "Woodchuck Woodsies", "Hide & Shriek", "The Little Witch", "Vampire Weekend", "Game Night", "Oldie But a Ghouldie", "Beast in Show", "Critters!", "Cuddle Monster", "Batty Fever", "Nanpire The Great", "Two Heads Are Better Than One", "Dust Bunnies", "Treasure Haunters" (mentioned), "Mummy's Day", "Acrobat Boris", "Transylvanian Tea", "Home Scream Home", "Countess Vee" and "There's Snow Place Like Home".

Season 2 (2018–20)
Vampirina and Demi was present in all episodes in this season.
Poppy was absent from 13 episodes: "Baby Dragon", "Desserter Mystery", "Gregoria Takes Flight", "The Big Bite" (mentioned), "Vamp-iversary", "Play It Again Vee", "Freeze our Guest" (mentioned), "This Haunted House Is Closed", "Dia de los Muertos", "The Scare Council", "A Gargoyle Carol" (mentioned), "Oh Brother" and "Au Revoir Remy".
Bridget was absent from 19 episodes: "Where’s Wolfie?", "Baby Dragon", "Desserter Mystery", "Beach Night", "Gregoria Takes Flight", "The Big Bite" (mentioned), "Vamp-iversary", "Play It Again Vee", "Freeze Our Guest", "This Haunted House Is Closed", "Dia de los Muertos", "The Scare Council", "The Not So Haunted House", "A Gargoyle Carol" (mentioned), "Deliver-Eek!", "The Great Esmeralda", "Frog's Breath", "Oh Brother" and "Au Revoir Remy".
Edgar was absent from 25 episodes: "The Woodsie Way", "Franken-Wedding", "Bat Hair Day", "Baby Dragon", "The Scare B & Vee", "The Birthday Broom", "Desserter Mystery", "Gregoria Takes Flight", "The Big Bite" (mentioned), "The Boo Boys Are Back", "Fright at the Museum", "Vamp-iversary", "Bat Got Your Tongue", "Play It Again Vee", "Freeze Our Guest", "This Haunted House Is Closed", "Dia de los Muertos", "The Scare Council", "Taking Scare of Business", "Hauntley Girls", "The Not So Haunted House", "A Gargoyle Carol" (mentioned), "The Great Esmeralda", "Oh Brother" and "Au Revoir Remy".

Season 3 (2020–21)
Vampirina and Demi was present in all episodes in this season.
Poppy was absent from 7 episodes: "Sincerely, Blobby", "Haunted House Call", "Fang Ten!", "Gregoria Gets Down", "The Fright Before Christmas", "The Curious Case of the Giggles" and "Daddy's Little Ghoul".
Bridget was absent from 11 episodes: "Weekly Normalness" (mentioned), "Sincerely, Blobby", "Haunted House Call" (mentioned), "Bust Friends", "Remy's Recipe", "Fang Ten!", "Gregoria Gets Down!", "Vee and the Family Stone", "The Fright Before Christmas", "The Curious Case of the Giggles" and "Daddy's Little Ghoul".
Edgar was absent from 30 episodes: "A Key for Vee", "A Ghoulish Tour", "Training Wings", "Nosy's Day In", "Sincerely, Blobby", "The Creepover", "Weekend with Grandpop!", "Haunted House Call", "Mirror Monster", "Bust Friends", "Fang Ten!", "Aw, Shucks", "Family Scareloom", "Bringing Down the House", "Gregoria Gets Down!", "Vee and the Family Stone", "Bora the Banshee", "A Tale of Two Hollows", "The Fright Before Christmas", "Scared Snowman", "New Century's Eve", "Bridget The Brave", "The Magic Howl", "April Ghoul's Day" (mentioned), "Monster's New Bed", "The Spelling Vee", "The Curious Case of the Giggles", "International Treasure", "Daddy's Little Ghoul" and "Chef Remy's Green Thumb".

References

Lists of American children's animated television series episodes